The siege of Singara took place in 360, when the Sasanian Empire, under Shapur II, besieged the town of Singara, held by the Roman Empire. The Sasanians successfully captured the town from the Romans. 

The wall was breached after some days by battering ram, and the town fell. The 1st Flavian and 1st Parthian legions which had formed the garrison, as well as the inhabitants of Singara, were sent into captivity in Sasanid Persia.

References

Sources
 
 
 

4th-century conflicts
Singara 360
Singara 360
Singara 360
History of Mesopotamia
4th century in Iran
360s in the Roman Empire
Shapur II
Sieges of the Roman–Persian Wars